Potassium channel subfamily K member 1 is a protein that in humans is encoded by the KCNK1 gene.

This gene encodes K2P1.1, a member of the superfamily of potassium channel proteins containing two pore-forming P domains. The product of this gene has not been shown to be a functional channel, however, and it may require other non-pore-forming proteins for activity.

See also
 Tandem pore domain potassium channel

References

Further reading

External links 
 

Ion channels